Genie's Cafe, or Genies Cafe, is a restaurant in Portland, Oregon.

Description
The restaurant is located in southeast Portland's Hosford-Abernethy neighborhood.

History
In 2014, Genie's owner Justin Johnson confirmed plans to start operating within the Space Room Lounge and neighboring Brite Spot Diner, creating Space Room Lounge and Genie's Too.

Reception
Genie's was included in The Oregonian 2008 overview of Portland's best restaurants serving biscuits and gravy.
In 2016, Lizzy Acker included the restaurant in the newspaper's list of the city's seven "best pancake spots".

The restaurant was a runner-up and placed third in the Best Benedict and Best Bloody Mary categories, respectively, in Willamette Week annual readers' poll in 2017. Drew Tyson and Dan Schlegel included Genie's in Thrillist's 2017 list of "The Best Places for Breakfast in Portland".

References

External links

 
 Genie’s Café at Portland Monthly
 Genies Cafe at Thrillist
 Genies Cafe at Zomato

Hosford-Abernethy, Portland, Oregon
Restaurants in Portland, Oregon